Sean D. Young (born 1979) is an American social and behavioral psychologist. He is a medical school and Computer and Information Sciences professor with the University of California, Irvine (UCI). He serves as the executive director of the University of California, Institute for Prediction Technology (UCIPT) and the UCLA Center for Digital Behavior (CDB).

Background
Young received his undergraduate degree in ethnomusicology from UCLA, and his master's degree in Health Services Research and PhD in psychology from Stanford University. Prior to joining UCLA as a postdoctoral fellow, Young worked in technology and user behavior/human factors at the NASA Ames Research Center and Cisco Systems. From 2011 to 2019, he was a professor with the UCLA Department of Family Medicine. Since 2019, he has had a split faculty appointment in the Departments of Emergency Medicine and Informatics at UCI.

Research interests 
Young's research focuses on the science behind human behavioral change. He is known for work on a range of issues related to technology, including how to implement social media in behavioral change interventions, how social technologies can predict behavior, wearable sensors, and the relationship between online and offline behavior. He has received grants to study how social media and mobile technologies can be used to predict and change behaviors in the areas of health and medicine, consumer behavior, cybersecurity, and crime.

Young has implemented social technologies to address issues related to HIV, drug use prevention, and how to get people to repeat healthy behaviors (e.g., adhere to a medication regimen or exercise routine). As of 2016, he has conducted studies in the United States, Peru, and South Africa, and among homeless youth, undergraduate students, and African American and Latino men who have sex with men.

In addition to his research on social networks, Young has become known for studies of how real-time data can be used to monitor disease and substance use–related behaviors. His work in this area focuses on media-sharing websites designed to evaluate people's activities, intentions, and social interactions. Insight from the resulting body of data ("social big data") is used to understand how people think and act in a variety of situations.

Scientific leadership 
Young is the Founder and executive director of UCIPT and the UCLA CDB. These two interdisciplinary centers were formed to advance research on the use of digital and mobile technologies to understand, predict, and change human behavior. Findings from studies published by the centers have been cited by a wide range of media outlets. As executive director of UCIPT, Young is partnering with people from multiple academic fields and business sectors, with the goal of scaling software applications to a diverse range of potential uses.

In 2015, Young received the UC President's Research Catalyst Award for a multi-campus collaborative project focusing on social big data.

Young created the Harnessing Online Peer Education (HOPE) online intervention, which combines behavior change science and social media. HOPE has been used to help change people's behaviors in the following areas: HIV and sexual risk behaviors, general health and fitness, drug use, chronic pain management and opioid addiction, and consumer behavior in business. Studies have shown that people who join HOPE communities are two to three times more likely to change their behavior as people who do not join the communities.

Young is also a speaker, teacher, and author of Stick with It: A Scientifically Proven Process for Changing Your Life-for Good, the #1 Wall Street Journal Best Selling book. He has presented his work at forums such as the European Parliament, mHealth Conference, and World Congress as well as to corporations and non-profit organizations. He teaches a rotating course in global health to UCLA undergraduate students and has served as a course instructor at Stanford University.

Selected publications 
Use of big data for health and behavioral prediction

Use of social networking and online communities to improve health behaviors

Global health studies

General behavior change, health, and social media studies

Guidelines for how to use technologies in healthcare and for behavior change

Community-based participatory research

Appointments 

 Associate Professor, UCLA Department of Family Medicine
 Executive Director, University of California, Institute for Prediction Technology
 Executive Director, UCLA Center for Digital Behavior
 Member of the following professional societies:
 International AIDS Society
 Society of Personality and Social Psychology
 Silicon Beach: Society of Los Angeles–based technology developers
 Society for Judgment and Decision Making
 European Health Psychology Society
 European Federation of IASP Chapters
 NASA Ames Research Center
 Healthcare Information and Management Systems Society

Awards 
 Stick with It: #1 Wall Street Journal Bestselling Book 
 Ruth L. Kirschstein National Research Service Award
 Stanford University Social E-challenge Competition Winner 
 Best Paper award at IEEE Virtual Reality 
 Network for AIDS Research in Los Angeles (NARLA) Seed Grant, Principal Investigator
 UCLA AIDS Institute HIV Prevention Seed Grant 
 UCLA CHIPTS Award for HIV prevention with innovative mobile technologies 
 NIMH K01: Using online social networks for HIV prevention in African-American and Latino MSM 
 UCLA Health System Appreciation Award for Excellence 
 mHealth Training Award
 Fordham Ethics Award in HIV prevention

Personal 
 Sean has been happily married to his wife since 2013 and they have two children together.

External links 
 UCLA Center for Digital Behavior
 UCLA Department of Family Medicine

References 

American neuroscientists
21st-century American psychologists
1979 births
Living people
Stanford University School of Humanities and Sciences alumni
David Geffen School of Medicine at UCLA faculty